Emma Irmgard Marina Rabbe Ramírez (born 18 April 1969) is a Canadian-Venezuelan television actress.

Miss World
Rabbe competed in Miss Venezuela 1988, as the representative of Distrito Federal, obtaining the title of "Miss World Venezuela". She represented her country in the Miss World 1988 pageant, where she was 3rd runner-up.

Life after Miss World
Rabbe had been married to Venezuelan actor Daniel Alvarado since 1998 until 2015. The couple has three sons, Daniel Alejandro (born 1999), Diego Jose (born 2001) and Calvin Daniel (born 3 May 2007).

Filmography

Films

Television

References

External links
 Emma Rabbe in VenCOR
 

1969 births
Living people
Miss World 1988 delegates
Miss Venezuela World winners
Actresses from Ottawa
RCTV personalities
Venezuelan telenovela actresses
Canadian people of Venezuelan descent
Venezuelan people of Canadian descent